The United States League was a minor Negro baseball league.

The United States League may also refer to:

United States Baseball League, a minor league in baseball
United States Hockey League
United States Hockey League (1945–1951)